Keshit or Kashit may refer to:
 Keshit, Anbarabad
 Kashit, Jiroft
 Keshit, Kerman
 Keshit, Qaleh Ganj
 Keshit Rural District, in Kerman County